Weser was a German fishing trawler that was requisitioned in the Second World War by the Kriegsmarine for use as a vorpostenboot. She was sunk in November 1939 but was raised, repaired and returned to service. She was returned to her owners in 1941 and served until 1962, when she was scrapped.

Description
The engine was built by Deschimag Seebeckwerft, Wesermünde, Germany. It was rated at 132nhp. It drove a single screw propeller via a low pressure turbine, double reduction gearing and a hydraulic coupling.

History
Weser was built as yard number 616 by Deschimag Seebeckwerft, Wesermünde for the Hanseatische Hochseefischerei AG, Bremerhaven, Germany. She was launched in September 1938 and completed on 14 October. The fishing boat registration BX 267 was allocated, as were the Code Letters DOUP.

On 27 September 1939, Weser was requistioned by the Kriegsmarine for use as a vorpostenboot. She was allocated to 3 Vorpostenflotille as  V 301 Weser. On 25 November, she struck a mine and sank in the Great Belt off Langeland, Denmark with the loss of seventeen lives. She was raised in December 1939, repaired and returned to service.

In December 1941, she was returned to the Hanseatische Hochseefischerei AG, with the registration PG 556. Her registration was changed to BX 348 in December 1948. She was scrapped by Eisen & Metall, Bremerhaven, West Germany in July 1962.

References

Sources

1938 ships
Ships built in Bremen (state)
Fishing vessels of Germany
Steamships of Germany
World War II merchant ships of Germany
Auxiliary ships of the Kriegsmarine
Maritime incidents in November 1939
Fishing vessels of West Germany